Agordat was a torpedo cruiser of the Italian Regia Marina built in the late 1890s. The ship, which was armed with twelve  guns and two  torpedo tubes, was too slow and short-ranged to be able to scout effectively for the fleet, so her career was limited. She saw action during the Italo-Turkish War in 1911–12, where she provided gunfire support to Italian troops in North Africa. She assisted in the occupation of Constantinople in the aftermath of World War I, and in 1919 she was reclassified as a gunboat. In January 1923, Agordat was sold for scrapping.

Design

Her propulsion system consisted of a pair of horizontal triple-expansion steam engines each driving a single screw propeller, with steam supplied by eight Blechynden water-tube boilers. She had a crew of between 153–185.

Agordat was armed with a main battery of twelve  L/40 guns mounted singly. She was also equipped with two  torpedo tubes.

Service history

Agordat was built at the Castellammare shipyard; her keel was laid down on 18 February 1897 and her completed hull was launched on 11 October 1899. After completing fitting-out work, the new cruiser was commissioned into the Italian fleet on 26 September 1900. Sea trials lasted from 11 February 1901 to 6 March, and during the final speed trial she exceeded her design speed by a knot. She nevertheless proved to be too slow and short-legged to be useful as a fleet scout, which limited her active duty career. She served in the main fleet in 1902–1904, during which time the fleet was kept in a state of readiness for seven months. For the remaining five months, the ships had reduced crews. In 1903, the unit also included eight battleships, six other cruisers, and six destroyers. By the 1904–1905 training year, the main squadron was reduced in size, with the two oldest battleships having been withdrawn, though three destroyers were added. During the 1908 fleet maneuvers, Agordat was assigned to the hostile force that was tasked with simulating an attempt to land troops on Sicily.

Italo-Turkish War
At the outbreak of the Italo-Turkish War against the Ottoman Empire in September 1911, Agordat was assigned in the 2nd Division of the 1st Squadron, under the command of Rear Admiral Ernesto Presbitero, the divisional commander. Negotiators were sent ashore to attempt to secure the surrender of the garrison, which was refused. Napoli and the armored cruisers bombarded the Ottoman positions throughout the day, and on 18 October the Ottomans withdrew, allowing the Italian troops to come ashore and take possession of the port. The fleet remained offshore and helped to repel Ottoman counterattacks over the following two weeks. Agordat and San Marco supported a raid against Ottoman positions at the oases at Al-Kuwayfiya on 28 November, which resulted in an inconclusive action and a withdrawal to Benghazi. There, they provided gunfire support to the Italian garrison against repeated Turkish assaults.

Agordat intercepted the French mail steamer  on 16 January 1912, which was carrying an aircraft and a pilot named Emile Duval; the Italians correctly suspected Duval had been hired by the Ottoman government and was headed to Tripoli to support Ottoman forces. Agordat accordingly ordered Carthage to follow her to Cagliari, Sardinia, where Duval and his aircraft were to be disembarked. Two days later, Agordat stopped the French steamer , which had Ottoman citizens aboard and was likewise escorted to Cagliari. The seizures caused a minor diplomatic incident between Italy and France, but the dispute was resolved after the Ottomans were disembarked from Manouba and Duval was permitted to remain aboard Carthage with his aircraft, which was delivered to Tunis, French Tunisia. In early April, Agordat, the torpedo cruiser , and several other vessels rendezvoused with a troop convoy carrying 10,000 men to Zuwarah near the border with Tunisia.

World War I and fate
By 1914, Agordat was assigned to the 2nd Division of the 2nd Squadron; the squadron consisted of two divisions of armored cruisers, each supported by a scout cruiser. Italy, a member of the Central Powers, declared neutrality at the start of World War I in August 1914, but by May 1915, the Triple Entente had convinced the Italians to enter the war against their former allies. Admiral Paolo Thaon di Revel, the Italian naval chief of staff, believed that Austro-Hungarian submarines could operate too effectively in the narrow waters of the Adriatic, which could also be easily seeded with minefields. The threat from these underwater weapons was too serious for him to use the fleet in an active way. Instead, Revel decided to implement blockade at the relatively safer southern end of the Adriatic with the main fleet, while smaller vessels, such as the MAS boats, conducted raids on Austro-Hungarian ships and installations.

In November 1918, Agordat participated in the occupation of Constantinople following the surrender of the Ottoman Empire. She and the battleship Roma joined a fleet of British, French, and Greek warships that entered the Dardanelles and landed troops to occupy the city. In 1921, Agordat was reclassified as a gunboat and her armament was modified; four of the 76 mm guns were replaced by a pair of  L/40 guns and the torpedo tubes were removed. This service lasted less than two years, and on 4 January 1923 the ship was sold for scrapping.

Notes

References

External links
 Agordat Marina Militare website 

Agordat-class cruisers
Cruisers of Italy
Ships built in Castellammare di Stabia
1899 ships